Scholarly communication of the Netherlands published in open access form can be found by searching the National Academic Research and Collaborations Information System (NARCIS).

Brill Publishers, National Library of the Netherlands, OAPEN Foundation, Stichting Fair Open Access Alliance, Utrecht University Library, and VU University Amsterdam Library belong to the Open Access Scholarly Publishers Association.

Policy
The Dutch government has voiced the ambition that by 2019 60% of all publications from Dutch research universities should be published as open access, and by 2024 this should be 100%. The  is negotiating big deals with publishers, where open access publication for Dutch corresponding authors is free of additional charge. In 2020, the Dutch research organised signed a four year transformative agreement with publishers Elsevier.

Repositories
There are some 36 collections of scholarship in the Netherlands housed in digital open access repositories.

See also

 Internet in the Netherlands
 Education in the Netherlands
 Media of the Netherlands
 Copyright law of the Netherlands
 List of libraries in the Netherlands
 Open access in other countries
 Plan S

References

Further reading

External links

 
 

Academia in the Netherlands
Communications in the Netherlands
Netherlands
Science and technology in the Netherlands